Chantilly Lace may refer to:

 Chantilly lace, a type of lace
 Chantilly Lace (song), a song by The Big Bopper
 Chantilly Lace (film), a 1993 film directed by Linda Yellen